Grupo Desportivo e Recreativo Crisgunza, better known as GDR Crisgunza, is an Angolan semi-professional basketball team based in Benguela. The club made its debut in the Angolan top basketball league in 2018 after winning the 2nd division league.

The team is owned and sponsored by Crisgunza, a construction enterprise based in the city.

Honours 
Angolan Second Division 

 Champions (1): 2017–18

Players

2018

See also
Angolan Basketball League
Federação Angolana de Basquetebol

References

Sports clubs in Angola
Basketball teams in Angola